Mitsinjo Betanimena is a municipality and a quarter of Toliara (Tuléar) in Madagascar. It belongs to the district of Toliara II, which is a part of Atsimo-Andrefana Region. The population of this municipality was estimated to be approximately 15,000 in 2001 census.

Geography
It is situated 4km north-west from Toliara (Tuléar) on the National road 9.

Hospitals
The university's hospital, the CHU Mitsinjo Betanimena and the University of Toliara are situated in this municipality.

References

Populated places in Atsimo-Andrefana